Tell Me I'm Dreaming is a 1998 French drama film directed by Claude Mouriéras. It was screened in the Un Certain Regard section at the 1998 Cannes Film Festival.

Cast
 Frédéric Pierrot - Luc
 Muriel Mayette - Jeanne
 Vincent Dénériaz - Julien
 Cédric Vieira - Jules
 Julien Charpy - Yannick
 Stéphanie Frey - Marion
 Suzanne Gradel - Grandmother
 Christophe Delachaux - Johnny
 Yvon Davis - Psychiatrist
 Katya Medici - Nini
 Patrice Verdeil - Policeman
 Hélène Wert - Charlotte
 Karine Kadi - Young doctor
 Rebecca Mahboubi - Talkative friend

References

External links

1998 films
1998 drama films
French drama films
1990s French-language films
Films directed by Claude Mouriéras
1990s French films